Dominika Małgorzata Chorosińska, née Figurska (born 28 December 1978 in Elbląg) is a Polish politician and actress. Member of the Sejm since 2019.

Filmography 
1999: Egzekutor
1999: Skok
2000: 6 dni strusia
2000: Enduro Bojz
2000: Nie ma zmiłuj
2001: Zostać miss2002–2008: M jak miłość''

External links 
Dominika Figurska at filmpolski.pl

Polish television actresses
1978 births
People from Elbląg
Living people
20th-century Polish actresses
21st-century Polish actresses
Members of the Polish Sejm 2019–2023
Women members of the Sejm of the Republic of Poland
21st-century Polish women politicians